XEPJ-AM is a radio station on 1370 AM in San Pedro Tlaquepaque, Jalisco, Mexico. It is owned by Grupo Radiorama and is known as Radio Ranchito with a Regional Mexican format.

History
XEPJ received its concession on May 15, 1964. It was owned by José de Jesús Cortés y Barbosa and broadcast with 500 watts. XEPJ affiliated to Grupo ACIR; it later picked up the "Radio Capital" rock format and was even sold to ACIR, doing business as Radio Capital, S.A. in 1981.

ACIR shed this station when it sold dozens of stations across the country to Radiorama.

In 2017, XEPJ and XEDKT-AM 1340 swapped formats. XEDKT picked up the Frecuencia Deportiva sports format previously on XEPJ, while the long-running Radio Ranchito Regional Mexican format from XEDKT moved to 1370.

References

1964 establishments in Mexico
Grupo Radiorama
Radio stations established in 1964
Radio stations in Guadalajara
Regional Mexican radio stations
Spanish-language radio stations